The Tasiast gold mine is an open-pit gold mine in Mauritania, owned and operated by Kinross Gold.

History
The Tasiast Gold Mine began production in 2008.  

In 2010, Kinross Gold purchased it as part of a $7.1-billion takeover of Red Back Mining.

Expansion
Following the purchase, Kinross began an expansion of the mine, which is scheduled to finish in 2014, increasing production from 56,000 ounces per year (as of 2010) to 1.5 million. 
   the expansion project was expected to be $1 billion over budget, but it later got scaled back. 

Kinross plans to build training facilities in the area, including a School of Mines.

Controversies
In 2015, the company came under fire in the Mauritanian media for allegedly favouring contractors tied to the government; Kinross Gold denied the allegations.

References

External links
 Tasiast mine (MRT-00477) Secretariat of the African, Caribbean and Pacific Group of States website
 Kinross Gold website
 Tasiast Project Website

Gold mines in Mauritania
Inchiri Region
Kinross Gold
Surface mines in Mauritania